Cucova may refer to several villages in Romania:

 Cucova, a village in Valea Seacă, Bacău
 Cucova, a village in Strunga Commune, Iaşi County